Rubidium telluride is the inorganic compound with the formula Rb2Te.  It is a yellow-green powder that melts at either 775 °C or 880 °C (two different values have been reported).  It is an obscure material of minor academic interest.

Like other alkali metal chalcogenides, Rb2Te is prepared from the elements in liquid ammonia.

Rubidium telluride is used in some space-based UV detectors.

References

External links
 
 

Tellurides
Rubidium compounds